Qosqophryne gymnotis is a species of frog in the family Strabomantidae.
It is known from only two sites near Abra Malaga, Cusco, Peru, at between 3,272 and 3,530 meters above sea level.
Its natural habitat is high altitude montane cloud forests, and lays its eggs in wet mosses. It was originally classified as a member of Bryophryne, but was later moved to the newly created genus Qosqophryne.

References

Strabomantidae
Endemic fauna of Peru
Amphibians of Peru
Amphibians described in 2009